Plasma etching is a form of plasma processing used to fabricate integrated circuits. It involves a high-speed stream of glow discharge (plasma) of an appropriate gas mixture being shot (in pulses) at a sample. The plasma source, known as etch species, can be either charged (ions) or neutral (atoms and radicals). During the process, the plasma generates volatile etch products at room temperature from the chemical reactions between the elements of the material etched and the reactive species generated by the plasma. Eventually the atoms of the shot element embed themselves at or just below the surface of the target, thus modifying the physical properties of the target.

Mechanisms

Plasma generation
A plasma is a high energetic condition in which a lot of processes can occur. These processes happen because of electrons and atoms. To form the plasma electrons have to be accelerated to gain energy. Highly energetic electrons transfer the energy to atoms by collisions. Three different processes can occur because of this collisions:
Excitation
Dissociation
Ionization

Different species are present in the plasma such as electrons, ions, radicals, and neutral particles. Those species are interacting with each other constantly. Plasma etching can be divided into two main types of interaction:
generation of chemical species
interaction with the surrounding surfaces

Without a plasma, all those processes would occur at a higher temperature. There are different ways to change the plasma chemistry and get different kinds of plasma etching or plasma depositions. One of the excitation techniques to form a plasma is by using RF excitation of a power source of 13.56 MHz.

The mode of operation of the plasma system will change if the operating pressure changes. Also, it is different for different structures of the reaction chamber. In the simple case, the electrode structure is symmetrical, and the sample is placed upon the grounded electrode.

Influences on the process
The key to develop successful complex etching processes is to find the appropriate gas etch chemistry that will form volatile products with the material to be etched as shown in Table 1. For some difficult materials (such as magnetic materials), the volatility can only be obtained when the wafer temperature is increased. The main factors that influence the plasma process:
Electron source
Pressure
Gas species
Vacuum

Surface interaction
The reaction of the products depend on the likelihood of dissimilar atoms, photons, or radicals reacting to form chemical compounds. The temperature of the surface also affects the reaction of products. Adsorption happens when a substance is able to gather and reach the surface in a condensed layer, ranging in thickness (usually a thin, oxidized layer.) Volatile products desorb in the plasma phase and help the plasma etching process as the material interacts with the sample's walls. If the products are not volatile, a thin film will form at the surface of the material. Different principles that affect a sample's ability for plasma etching:
Volatility
Adsorption
Chemical Affinity
Ion-bombarding
Sputtering
Plasma etching can change the surface contact angles, such as hydrophilic to hydrophobic, or vice versa. Argon plasma etching has reported to enhance contact angle from 52 deg to 68 deg, and, Oxygen plasma etching to reduce contact angle from 52 deg to 19 deg for CFRP composites for bone plate applications. Plasma etching has been reported to reduce the surface roughness from hundreds of nanometers to as much lower as 3 nm for metals.

Types
Pressure influences the plasma etching process. For plasma etching to happen, the chamber has to be under low pressure, less than 100 Pa. In order to generate low-pressure plasma, the gas has to be ionized. The ionization happens by a glow charge. Those excitations happen by an external source, which can deliver up to 30 kW and frequencies from 50 Hz (dc) over 5–10 Hz (pulsed dc) to radio and microwave frequency (MHz-GHz).

Microwave plasma etching
Microwave etching happens with an excitation sources in the microwave frequency, so between MHz and GHz. One example of plasma etching is shown here.

Hydrogen plasma etching
One form to use gas as plasma etching is hydrogen plasma etching. Therefore, an experimental apparatus like this can be used:

Plasma etcher
A plasma etcher, or etching tool, is a tool used in the production of semiconductor devices.  A plasma etcher produces a plasma from a process gas, typically oxygen or a fluorine-bearing gas, using a high frequency electric field, typically 13.56 MHz.  A silicon wafer is placed in the plasma etcher, and the air is evacuated from the process chamber using a system of vacuum pumps.  Then a process gas is introduced at low pressure, and is excited into a plasma through dielectric breakdown.

Plasma confinement
Industrial plasma etchers often feature plasma confinement to enable repeatable etch rates and precise spatial distributions in   plasmas. One method of confining plasmas is by using the properties of the Debye sheath, a near-surface layer in plasmas similar to the double layer in other fluids. For example, if the Debye sheath length on a slotted quartz part is at least half the width of the slot, the sheath will close off the slot and confine the plasma, while still permitting uncharged particles to pass through the slot.

Applications
Plasma etching is currently used to process semiconducting materials for their use in the fabrication of electronics. Small features can be etched into the surface of the semiconducting material in order to be more efficient or enhance certain properties when used in electronic devices. For example, plasma etching can be used to create deep trenches on the surface of silicon for uses in microelectromechanical systems. This application suggests that plasma etching also has the potential to play a major role in the production of microelectronics. Similarly, research is currently being done on how the process can be adjusted to the nanometer scale.

Hydrogen plasma etching, in particular, has other interesting applications. When used in the process of etching semiconductors, hydrogen plasma etching has been shown to be effective in removing portions of native oxides found on the surface. Hydrogen plasma etching also tends to leave a clean and chemically balanced surface, which is ideal for a number of applications.

Oxygen plasma etching can be used for anisotropic deep-etching of diamond nanostructures by application of high bias in inductively coupled plasma/reactive ion etching (ICP/RIE) reactor. On the other hand, the use of oxygen 0V bias plasmas can be used for isotropic surface termination of C-H terminated diamond surface.

Integrated circuits
Plasma can be used to grow a silicon dioxide film on a silicon wafer (using an oxygen plasma), or can be used to remove silicon dioxide by using a fluorine bearing gas.  When used in conjunction with photolithography, silicon dioxide can be selectively applied or removed to trace paths for circuits.

For the formation of integrated circuits it is necessary to structure various layers. This can be done with a plasma etcher.  Before etching, a photoresist is deposited on the surface, illuminated through a mask, and developed. The dry etch is then performed so that structured etching is achieved. After the process, the remaining photoresist has to be removed. This is also done in a special plasma etcher, called an asher.

Dry etching allows a reproducible, uniform etching of all materials used in silicon and III-V semiconductor technology. By using inductively coupled plasma/reactive ion etching (ICP/RIE), even hardest materials like e.g. diamond can be nanostructured.

Plasma etchers are also used for de-layering integrated circuits in failure analysis.

See also
List of plasma (physics) articles
Plasma cleaning
Plasma etcher

References

External links
http://stage.iupac.org/publications/pac/pdf/1990/pdf/6209x1699.pdf

Plasma processing
Semiconductor device fabrication